The A-League Youth Golden Boot, formerly Y-League Golden Boot, is an annual soccer award presented to the leading goalscorer in the Y-League, currently referred to as the Nike Golden Boot for sponsorship purposes.

The Y-League was founded in 2008. The number of teams in the league has ranged from seven to ten during its history, and there are currently ten clubs in the league. The award is given to the top-scorer over the regular season (not including the finals series/grand final).

Francesco Monterosso is the only player to have won the award on multiple occasions.

Winners

Awards won by club

See also
Y-League records and statistics
A-League Golden Boot
W-League Golden Boot

References

External links
 A-League Youth official website

Australian soccer trophies and awards
Y-League
Australia Youth